Ōwhata is a semi-rural suburb of Rotorua in the Bay of Plenty region of New Zealand's North Island.

In 2015, it had the highest house sales of any suburb in Rotorua.

Marae

The local Ōwhata or Hinemoa Marae and is a meeting place for the Ngāti Whakaue hapū of Ngāti Korouateka and  Ngāti te Roro o te Rangi. It includes the Tūtanekai meeting house.

In October 2020, the Government committed $4,525,104 from the Provincial Growth Fund to upgrade the marae and nine others, creating an estimated 34 jobs.

Demographics

Ōwhata had a population of 6,216 at the 2018 New Zealand census, an increase of 720 people (13.1%) since the 2013 census, and an increase of 777 people (14.3%) since the 2006 census. There were 2,022 households, comprising 2,991 males and 3,225 females, giving a sex ratio of 0.93 males per female, with 1,575 people (25.3%) aged under 15 years, 1,128 (18.1%) aged 15 to 29, 2,580 (41.5%) aged 30 to 64, and 933 (15.0%) aged 65 or older.

Ethnicities were 62.0% European/Pākehā, 45.9% Māori, 5.3% Pacific peoples, 7.3% Asian, and 1.7% other ethnicities. People may identify with more than one ethnicity.

The percentage of people born overseas was 15.0, compared with 27.1% nationally.

Although some people chose not to answer the census's question about religious affiliation, 51.9% had no religion, 33.3% were Christian, 3.0% had Māori religious beliefs, 1.6% were Hindu, 0.3% were Muslim, 0.5% were Buddhist and 1.8% had other religions.

Of those at least 15 years old, 699 (15.1%) people had a bachelor's or higher degree, and 945 (20.4%) people had no formal qualifications. 519 people (11.2%) earned over $70,000 compared to 17.2% nationally. The employment status of those at least 15 was that 2,208 (47.6%) people were employed full-time, 678 (14.6%) were part-time, and 264 (5.7%) were unemployed.

Education

References

Suburbs of Rotorua
Populated places on Lake Rotorua